"Spiral" is episode 20 of season 5 of the television series Buffy the Vampire Slayer.

The premise of Buffy the Vampire Slayer is that an adolescent girl, Buffy Summers, is chosen by mystical forces and given superhuman powers to kill vampires, demons, and other evil creatures in the fictional town of Sunnydale.

Plot
With Glory now possessing knowledge that Dawn is the Key, Buffy and Dawn run for their lives and escape, thanks to Willow's magic and a large semi-truck slamming into Glory out on the street after which she transforms into Ben, ending the chase. The gang gathers in Xander's apartment to discuss possible plans of action, where Buffy surprises everyone by declaring that they will never be able to defeat Glory and the only way to stay alive is to leave Sunnydale, to which the gang reluctantly agrees. Spike solves their transportation problem by providing a sun-protected Winnebago, and Buffy allows him to accompany them. Though Giles and Xander are anything but pleased by this, Buffy informs them that she and Spike are now the only ones who stand a chance at protecting Dawn in the event that Glory catches up to them.

Ben talks to one of Glory's minions, who reminds him that he is just a human body encasing Glory's god form and that upon her full rejuvenation, he will die; Ben, knowing this, states that he will do anything in his power to keep his life, even destroying the Key (whom he knows to be Dawn). The Knights of Byzantium retrieve their crazed member from the hospital, who babbles that the Key is the Slayer's sister; their General, Gregor, orders the Knights to assemble for battle.

Giles, driving the RV, talks with a motion-sick Xander about Buffy's state of mind. Depressed and worried about their future plans, Buffy is comforted by Dawn until the Knights attack surprising everyone but Buffy, who had never told the Scoobies about her earlier encounter with the Knights. A sword through the roof nearly kills Buffy, but Spike stops it with his bare hands. While Buffy battles the Knights from the top of the RV, one knight impales Giles with a thrown spear, causing the RV to crash onto its side. The Scoobies rush to an abandoned gas station, where Buffy fends off a siege by the Knights until Willow erects a barrier spell; Gregor, having fallen during the siege, is also contained in Willow's forcefield with the others, making him an unanticipated prisoner of war. Meanwhile, at the hospital, all those left crazy by Glory repeatedly mutter, "It's time". Spike suggests to Xander that they run, with some (most notably himself) sacrificing their lives so the others can escape, but Buffy refuses to let anyone die.

The now-revived Gregor taunts Buffy over the dissension in her ranks, but Buffy silences his mockery with a blow to the face, prompting him to be more cooperative and provide the answers that have eluded the Scoobies since Glory's arrival in Sunnydale: one of three hell gods that ruled over one of the more horrific demon dimensions, Glory's fellow hell gods, fearing her lust for power would drive her to seize the dimension for her own, attacked first. After emerging victorious from the bloody war that ensued, but unable to destroy her, the other gods banished Glory to Earth, to wither and die as a mortal. The magic which would allow Glory to return to her dimension was embodied in the Key, which the Knights sought to destroy but which a sect of monks instead concealed from both Glory and the Knights, hoping to eventually use the Key's power for good. In the intervening years, both Glory and the Knights have hunted for the monks and the Key, but Glory ultimately found the monks first, who before their deaths, converted the Key into the form of Dawn, confident Buffy would protect her. The Knights, arriving too late to prevent the monks' deaths, remained in Sunnydale, where they, like Glory, sought to wrestle the Key from Buffy's control. Glory's goal is to use Dawn's blood in a ritual to open a portal, allowing her to return to her home dimension and reclaim power.

Gregor further explains that Dawn's power will, in opening the portal, dissolve the boundaries between dimensions, essentially causing the collapse of reality; Glory herself is well aware of these facts, Gregor adds, but she will gladly allow such chaos so long as she can return to gain her revenge. However, if Dawn dies before Glory finds her, Glory's plan is doomed to failure and the dimensional boundaries, including those that protect Earth, will remain safe, and it is for this reason the Knights seek Dawn's death. Gregor also informs Buffy that, upon Glory's banishment, she was bound to a newborn human male, who has served as her host body ever since and who is now an adult, whose identity the Knights, despite their best efforts, have yet to learn (but whom the audience knows is Ben); if that man is killed while in mortal form, then Glory, within him, will also perish and, without the threat of Glory's ritual, Dawn herself will pose no further danger to the dimensional boundaries. Although shaken by these revelations, Buffy remains dedicated to protecting Dawn's life and defeating Glory before she can use Dawn in her ritual.

Realizing that Giles is seriously injured, Buffy, through Xander, arranges a deal with the Knights to allow Ben to safely pass and treat Giles' injuries in return for Gregor's guaranteed safety; Ben stabilizes Giles, and then is left alone with Gregor. Recognizing Ben as an outsider (although not as Glory's host body), Gregor tries to tempt him into killing Dawn, whose death will end the conflict as far as the Knights, who have no other quarrel with Buffy and the Scoobies, are concerned. Ben realizes that Glory is about to take over his body, but before he can get outside the forcefield, Glory comes forth, stunning the Scoobies and horrifying Gregor. Exuberant that Ben has "finally [done] something right", she kills Gregor, fights off the Scooby Gang to take Dawn, and bursts through the forcefield. By the time Willow releases the field, Glory has disposed of all the Knights and disappeared with Dawn. Knowing they have to move fast, everyone heads for Ben's car to chase after Glory. Having lost Dawn to Glory after going through so much to protect her — having in fact unknowingly guaranteed Glory's victory by extorting the Knights to allow Ben through the forcefield, to begin with — Buffy suffers a nervous breakdown and collapses into a state of shock.

References

External links

 

Buffy the Vampire Slayer (season 5) episodes
2001 American television episodes
Television episodes about child abduction